Jan Herman van Heek (Enschede, 20 October 1873 – Doetinchem, 25 January 1957) was a Dutch industrialist, textile manufacturer, patron of the arts, art collector and nature conservationist and owner of Huis Bergh.

References

1873 births
1957 deaths
Dutch businesspeople
Dutch art collectors
Dutch philanthropists
Dutch conservationists
People from Enschede